FC Zimbru is a Moldovan football club based in Botanica, Chișinău. They were the first Moldovan club to enter European competition, entering the UEFA Champions League in 1993. Since then, the club has competed in every UEFA-organised competition, with the exception of the now-defunct Intertoto Cup.Zimbru played their first European match on 18 August 1993 against Beitar from Jerusalem. The match took place at Republican Stadium in Chișinău, ended in a 1–1 draw, with Radu Rebeja scoring the equalizer in front of 13,000 spectators.Midfielder Boris Cebotari holds the record for playing in the most European matches for Zimbru with 31 appearances while Vadim Boreț, Victor Berco and Sergiu Epureanu are the club's top scorers with five goals each. In total, Zimbru have appeared in 19 European competitions.

Matches
{| class="wikitable" style="font-size:87%; text-align: center;"
! width="80"|Season
! width="150"|Competition
! width="150|Round
! width="150"|Opponent
! width="53|Home
! width="53|Away
! width="80|Agg.
!
|-
| 1993–94
| Champions League
| Preliminary round
| align="left" | Beitar Jerusalem
| bgcolor="#ffffdd"|1–1
| bgcolor="#ffdddd"|0–2
| 1–3
| 
|-bgcolor=#EEEEEE
| 1994–95
| UEFA Cup
| Preliminary round
| align="left" | Kispest Honvéd
| bgcolor="#ffdddd"|0–1
| bgcolor="#ffdddd"|1–4
| 1–5
| 
|-
| rowspan=3|1995–96
| rowspan=3|UEFA Cup
| Preliminary round
| align="left" | Hapoel Tel Aviv
| bgcolor="#ddffdd"|2–0
| bgcolor="#ffffdd"|0–0
| 2–0
| 
|-
| First round
| align="left" | RAF Jelgava
| bgcolor="#ddffdd"|1–0
| bgcolor="#ddffdd"|2–1
| 3–1
| 
|-
| Second round
| align="left" | Sparta Prague
| bgcolor="#ffdddd"|0–2
| bgcolor="#ffdddd"|3–4
| 3–6
| 
|-bgcolor=#EEEEEE
| 1996–97 
| UEFA Cup
| Preliminary round
| align="left" | Hajduk Split
| bgcolor="#ffdddd"|0–4
| bgcolor="#ffdddd"|1–2
| 1–6
| 
|-
| 1997–98
| Cup Winners' Cup
| Qualifying round
| align="left" | Shakhtar Donetsk
| bgcolor="#ffffdd"|1–1
| bgcolor="#ffdddd"|0–3
| 1–4
| 
|-bgcolor=#EEEEEE
| 1998–99
| Champions League
| First qualifying round
| align="left" | Újpest
| bgcolor="#ddffdd"|1–0
| bgcolor="#ffdddd"|1–3
| 2–3
| 
|-
| rowspan=4|1999–00
| rowspan=3|Champions League
| First qualifying round
| align="left" | St Patrick's Athletic
| bgcolor="#ddffdd"|5–0
| bgcolor="#ddffdd"|5–0
| 10–0
| 
|-
| Second qualifying round
| align="left" | Dinamo Tbilisi
| bgcolor="#ddffdd"|2–0
| bgcolor="#ffdddd"|1–2
| 3–2
| 
|-
| Third qualifying round
| align="left" | PSV Eindhoven
| bgcolor="#ffffdd"|0–0
| bgcolor="#ffdddd"|0–2
| 0–2
| 
|-
| UEFA Cup
| First round
| align="left" | Tottenham Hotspur
| bgcolor="#ffffdd"|0–0
| bgcolor="#ffdddd"|0–3
| 0–3
| 
|-bgcolor=#EEEEEE
| rowspan=4|2000–01
| rowspan=3|Champions League
| First qualifying round
| align="left" | KF Tirana
| bgcolor="#ddffdd"|3–2
| bgcolor="#ddffdd"|3–2
| 6–4
| 
|-bgcolor=#EEEEEE
| Second qualifying round
| align="left" | Maribor
| bgcolor="#ddffdd"|2–0
| bgcolor="#ffdddd"|0–1
| 2–1
| 
|-bgcolor=#EEEEEE
| Third qualifying round
| align="left" | Sparta Prague
| bgcolor="#ffdddd"|0–1
| bgcolor="#ffdddd"|0–1
| 0–2
| 
|-bgcolor=#EEEEEE
| UEFA Cup
| First round
| align="left" | Hertha Berlin
| bgcolor="#ffdddd"|1–2
| bgcolor="#ffdddd"|0–2
| 1–4
| 
|-
| 2001–02
| UEFA Cup
| Qualifying round
| align="left" | Gaziantepspor
| bgcolor="#ffffdd"|0–0
| bgcolor="#ffdddd"|1–4
| 1–4
| 
|-bgcolor=#EEEEEE
| rowspan=2|2002–03
| rowspan=2|UEFA Cup
| Qualifying round
| align="left" | IFK Göteborg
| bgcolor="#ddffdd"|3–1
| bgcolor="#ffffdd"|2–2
| 5–3
| 
|-bgcolor=#EEEEEE
| First round
| align="left" | Real Betis
| bgcolor="#ffdddd"|0–2
| bgcolor="#ffdddd"|1–2
| 1–4
| 
|-
| rowspan=2|2003–04
| rowspan=2|UEFA Cup
| Qualifying round
| align="left" | Litex Lovech
| bgcolor="#ddffdd"|2–0
| bgcolor="#ffffdd"|0–0
| 2–0
| 
|-
| First round
| align="left" | Aris
| bgcolor="#ffffdd"|1–1
| bgcolor="#ffdddd"|1–2
| 2–3
| 
|-bgcolor=#EEEEEE
| rowspan=2|2006–07
| rowspan=2|UEFA Cup
| First qualifying round
| align="left" | Qarabağ
| bgcolor="#ffffdd"|1–1
| bgcolor="#ddffdd"|2–1 (aet)
| 3–2
| 
|-bgcolor=#EEEEEE
| Second qualifying round
| align="left" | Metalurh Zaporizhya
| bgcolor="#ffffdd"|0–0
| bgcolor="#ffdddd"|0–3
| 0–3
| 
|-
| 2007–08
| UEFA Cup
| First qualifying round
| align="left" | Artmedia Petržalka
| bgcolor="#ffffdd"|2–2
| bgcolor="#ffffdd"|1–1
| 3–3 (a)
| 
|-bgcolor=#EEEEEE
| rowspan=2|2009–10
| rowspan=2|Europa League
| First qualifying round
| align="left" | Okzhetpes
| bgcolor="#ffdddd"|1–2
| bgcolor="#ddffdd"|2–0
| 3–2
| 
|-bgcolor=#EEEEEE
| Second qualifying round
| align="left" | Paços de Ferreira
| bgcolor="#ffffdd"|0–0
| bgcolor="#ffdddd"|0–1
| 0–1
| 
|-
| rowspan=2|2012–13
| rowspan=2|Europa League
| First qualifying round
| align="left" | Bangor City
| bgcolor="#ddffdd"|2–1
| bgcolor="#ffffdd"|0–0
| 2–1
| 
|-
| Second qualifying round
| align="left" | Young Boys Bern
| bgcolor="#ddffdd"|1–0 (aet)
| bgcolor="#ffdddd"|0–1
| 1–1 (1–4 p)
| 
|-bgcolor=#EEEEEE
| rowspan=4|2014–15
| rowspan=4|Europa League
| First qualifying round
| align="left" | Shkëndija Tetovo
| bgcolor="#ddffdd"|2–0
| bgcolor="#ffdddd"|1–2
| 3–2
| 
|-bgcolor=#EEEEEE
| Second qualifying round
| align="left" | CSKA Sofia
| bgcolor="#ffffdd"|0–0
| bgcolor="#ffffdd"|1–1
| 1–1 (a)
| 
|-bgcolor=#EEEEEE
| Third qualifying round
| align="left" | Grödig
| bgcolor="#ffdddd"|0–1
| bgcolor="#ddffdd"|2–1
| 2–2 (a)
| 
|-bgcolor=#EEEEEE
| Play-off round
| align="left" | PAOK
| bgcolor="#ddffdd"|1–0
| bgcolor="#ffdddd"|0–4
| 1–4
| 
|-
| rowspan=2|2016–17
| rowspan=2|Europa League
| First qualifying round
| align="left" | Chikhura Sachkhere
| bgcolor="#ffdddd"|0–1
| bgcolor="#ddffdd"|3–2
| 3–3 (a)
| 
|-
| Second qualifying round
| align="left" | Osmanlıspor
| bgcolor="#ffffdd"|2–2
| bgcolor="#ffdddd"|0–5
| 2–7
| 
|}

Overall record

By competition

By country

All-time goal scorers in UEFA club competitions
Names, that appear in bold, indicate players currently playing for Zimbru.

Statistics are correct as of 21 July 2016.

Key

Own goal
  Simon Handle (in the match Grödig – Zimbru)

Most appearances in UEFA club competitions

Statistics are correct as of 21 July 2016.

UEFA ranking 2021

As of 29 May 2021. Source

Record results
Biggest home win: Zimbru – St Patrick's Dublin 5:0 (21 July 1999)
Biggest home defeat: Zimbru – Hajduk Split 0:4  (17 July 1996)
Biggest away win: St Patrick's Dublin – Zimbru 0:5 (14 July 1999)
Biggest away defeat: Osmanlıspor Ankara – Zimbru 5:0 (21 July 2016)

See also
Moldovan football clubs in European competitions

References

External links
 Zimbru Chișinău at UEFA.com
 Zimbru Chișinău at worldfootball.net
 Zimbru Chișinău at mackolik.com
 Zimbru Chișinău at soccerway.com

FC Zimbru Chișinău
Zimbru